Maximiliano Nicolás Meza (born 13 June 1997) is an Argentine professional footballer who plays as a midfielder.

Career
Meza's senior career got underway in Torneo Federal B with Ex Alumnos Escuela N°185 between 2014 and 2015, with the midfielder appearing five times in the fourth tier of Argentine football. Meza soon made a move to Primera B Nacional's Independiente Rivadavia. He made his professional bow on 25 August 2018 during an away victory against Los Andes, coming off the bench in place of Franco Negri. He remained until the end of 2019, when he would join Torneo Regional Federal Amateur side Gutiérrez SC. He made two appearances before the COVID-19 pandemic halted the division.

In November 2020, Meza headed up to Torneo Federal A with Estudiantes. He scored his first senior league goal on 19 December against Círculo Deportivo.

Career statistics
.

References

External links

1997 births
Living people
Place of birth missing (living people)
Argentine footballers
Association football midfielders
Primera Nacional players
Torneo Federal A players
Independiente Rivadavia footballers
Club Sportivo Estudiantes players
People from San Luis, Argentina